Harald Meldal Eia (born 9 February 1966) is a Norwegian comedian, and sociologist.  In recent years, Eia has also made TV-documentaries and written books. 

Eia became a household name in Norway in the mid-90s and has since then been one of country´s most well-known comedians.

Life and career
Eia was born in Bærum.  He graduated with a Candidate's degree in sociology at the University of Oslo in 1992, with the thesis Lidende ledere og kompetente kalkulatører. Næringslivsfolks symbolske kamper, which in English translates as Suffering leaders and competent calculators. The symbolic struggles of business people.

Together with Bård Tufte Johansen, he has been author of, and participated in, several successful Norwegian Broadcasting Corporation comedy TV series, such as Lille Lørdag (1995), Åpen Post (1998–2002), Uti vår hage (2003), Team Antonsen (2004), Tre brødre som ikke er brødre (2005), Uti vår hage 2 (2008),  and Storbynatt, as well as the radio comedy shows Herreavdelingen (1997) and Tazte priv (2004–2005). Popular characters include "Lena" (a parody of the character from Døden på Oslo S) and Oslolosen. He has also performed stand-up comedy and theatresports and had supporting roles in Norwegian films, including Detector (2000) and United (2003).

In 2010, he introduced a television show called Hjernevask ("Brainwash") which contrasted cultural determinist models of human behavior (also referred to as the Standard social science model) with nature-nurture interactionist perspectives. Several of those who were interviewed for the show, particularly Jørgen Lorentzen, criticized the show publicly both before and after the airing, and this ignited a wide public discussion on the subject of the nature versus nurture debate. Especially the question of gender, and what is referred to as the gender paradox (the fact that although Norwegian women have a high level of participation within the workforce, more so than most countries, the Norwegian job market remains highly segregated in terms of gender) has provoked controversy.

For Hjernevask, he was awarded the Fritt Ord Honorary Award in 2010.

Since 2017, Eia has, together with Nils Brenna, produced the podcast- and radio-series "Sånn er du", where a famous Norwegian takes a Big 5-personality test for each episode. Eia and Brenna then discuss their way through the results of the personality test together the person who took the test.

In 2020, Eia published a book on why Norway has become so prosperous in recent times.

List of appearances

Television

Filmography

Radio

References

External links
 The Harald Eia's "Hjernevask (Brainwash)" television series examined the very different perceptions and theoretical orientations of cultural determinists and evolutionary adaptationists.
 http://feelgoodtv.no
  * The Gender Equality Paradox
  * The Parental Effect
  * Gay/Straight
  * Violence
  * Sex
  * Race
  * Nature or Nurture
  
 

1966 births
Living people
Norwegian male comedians
Norwegian television personalities
Norwegian radio personalities
NRK people
University of Oslo alumni
People from Bærum
Norwegian sociologists